Haret Al Fawar,   Haret el Fouar,  Haret El-Fouar,  is a village in Zgharta District, in the Northern Governorate of Lebanon with a Maronite Christian and Sunni Muslim population.

The village is located on a foothill of Terboul Mountain, surrounded by valleys. There's a mosque located in the middle of the old section of the village, as well as a modern hall for Islamic occasions such as weddings and Mawlid of the Prophet Muhammad. More than 80% of its population are Muslims, and most are with AICP (Association of Islamic Charitable Projects). 

Haret Al Fawar's residents highly value olive and oil, in addition to other items, such as figs, wheat and the green plants which grow naturally in the region.

Etymology
The village's name, which translates to "bubbling lane," originates from a stream that used to be a main source of drinking water for the residents.

History
For the past 100 years, the village has been populated by three main families: Awik, Jalloul, and Tabbaa.

During the Lebanese civil war, from 1975 till 1990, the village witnessed much destruction due to bombardment.

References

External links
 Haret el Fouar, Localiban
Ehden Family Tree 

Populated places in the North Governorate
Zgharta District
Maronite Christian communities in Lebanon
Sunni Muslim communities in Lebanon